Calamophis is a genus of snakes of the family Homalopsidae.

Species
 Calamophis jobiensis (Meyer, 1874)
 Calamophis katesandersae Murphy, 2012
 Calamophis ruuddelangi Murphy, 2012
 Calamophis sharonbrooksae Murphy, 2012

References

Further reading
Murphy, John. (2012). Synonymised and forgotten, The Bird's Head stout-tailed snakes, Calamophis Meyer (Squamata: Serpentes: Homalopsidae). Raffles Bulletin of Zoology. 60. 

Snake genera
Colubrids
Taxa named by Adolf Bernhard Meyer